ProgPower UK is a progressive and power metal festival held annually in the United Kingdom since 2006. Its latest edition, which would have taken place in the Anson Rooms at the University of Bristol on 28 March – 29 March 2008, headlined by Evergrey and Vanden Plas, was cancelled due to financial difficulties.

History
ProgPower UK was a one-day event for its first two years (although a smaller pre-show party was held each year the day before the main festival) and is expanding to a two-day event in 2008. It began in 2006, and was held in Cheltenham at The Centaur, a large modern venue on the grounds of Cheltenham Racecourse. The festival returned to The Centaur in 2007 but for its third year will be moving to the Anson Rooms at the University of Bristol. The move coincides with the expansion of the festival from one to two days, with both days to be held at the same venue. The official website states that the 2008 ProgPower Festival has been cancelled due to financial difficulties.

Lineups

References

External links
Official website

Heavy metal festivals in the United Kingdom
Music festivals established in 2006